Ruth Qaulluaryuk (born 1932) is a Canadian Inuit textile artist, also known for her drawings.

Qaulluaryuk is a native of the Back River area of the Keewatin Region of the Northwest Territories, much of which is today's Kivalliq Region of Nunavut. Like many Inuit she lived a nomadic existence until the 1950s, when a shortage of food led to a starvation crisis; as a result, she and her family moved to the settlement of Baker Lake in the early 1970s to find stability and to enable her children to go to school. They were among the last families to make the move. To contribute to the family income Qaulluaryuk began to sew clothing and craft items to sell to the government arts and crafts program; she has no formal training as an artist. In 1974 two of her wall hangings appeared in the "Crafts from Arctic Canada" exhibition sponsored by the Canadian Eskimo Arts Council, and that same year her drawing Tundra with River was selected for the fourth Baker Lake Annual Print Collection. Hundreds and Hundreds, Herds of Caribou was printed in the following year's collection, and her reputation was established. She has continued to contribute work to exhibits in Canada and the United States, and her work is in the collections of the National Gallery of Canada, the Canadian Museum of Civilization, the National Museum of the American Indian, the Macdonald Stewart Art Centre, the Winnipeg Art Gallery, the Prince of Wales Northern Heritage Centre, and the Simon Fraser Gallery at Simon Fraser University. Qaulluaryuk is the daughter of artist Luke Anguhadluq and the wife of artist Josiah Nuilaalik, with whom she has seven children.

Qaulluaryuk's work was included in the Winnipeg Art Gallery's inaugural exhibition, INUA, at the Gallery's new Inuit art center, Qaumajuq in 2021.

References

1932 births
Living people
Canadian textile artists
Inuit textile artists
20th-century Canadian artists
20th-century Canadian women artists
21st-century Canadian artists
21st-century Canadian women artists
People from Baker Lake
Canadian Inuit women
Artists from Nunavut
Women textile artists
Indigenous fashion designers of the Americas
Inuit from the Northwest Territories
Inuit from Nunavut
Canadian women fashion designers